Leptynia is a genus of stick insects belonging to the tribe Gratidiini.  The species of this genus are found in Iberian Peninsula.

Species
GBIF lists:

Leptynia acuta 
Leptynia annaepaulae 
Leptynia attenuata 
Leptynia caprai 
Leptynia montana 
Leptynia platensis

References

Gratidiini
Phasmatodea genera